The Electoral division of Huon is one of the 15 electoral divisions in the Tasmanian Legislative Council. It was created in 1999, however similar electorates of this name have existed since 1900,  and members of the Tasmanian upper house for this region appear to have been elected since 1856.

The total area of the division is  since a redistribution in August 2017.

As of 31 January 2019, there were 25,335 enrolled voters in the division. The current sitting member of the division is Dean Harris, elected in the 2022 by-election. The next periodic election in the division is due in May 2026.

The division includes the local municipalities of Huon Valley and Kingborough. Localities include Huonville, Margate, Cygnet, Franklin, Geeveston, Bruny Island, Snug, and Howden.

Members

See also

 Tasmanian House of Assembly

References

External links
Parliament of Tasmania
Tasmanian Electoral Commission - Legislative Council

Huon
Southern Tasmania